North Lincoln High School is a public school in Lincolnton, North Carolina, United States. North Lincoln was completed in 2003, and the total student population is approximately 1,050. The school mascot is the Knight, and the school colors (as originally adopted) are Royal Blue, Silver, and Black, with white as an accent color. The principal is Chip Cathey. Assistant principals are Lee Rice and Jason Cranford.

History
North Lincoln was completed in 2003 and became the fourth high school in the Lincoln County school district. The students for the new school came from East Lincoln High School and Lincolnton High School.

Athletics
North Lincoln has a variety of athletic sports teams. They are affiliated with the  North Carolina High School Athletic Association (NCHSAA), and are currently classified as a 2A school.

The North Lincoln Men's Golf Team won back to back state 2A championships in 2009 and 2010 and state runner-up in 2011, 2012, and 2013.

The girls' cross country team has won 4 straight regional championships (2009, 10, 11, 12) and have placed in the top three in the state championship four straight years. The boys have won two regional titles, and won three state championship titles in 2011, 2012, and 2017.

North Lincoln's Swim Team won a state championship in 2014.

The North Lincoln Men's Baseball Team won the Class 2A  baseball championship in 2019. North Lincoln (26–6), which shared the South Fork 2A regular-season title with West Lincoln Rebels, beat the Rebels to win the West region 2A title. North Lincoln rallied at UNC Greensboro and won the state 2A baseball title, two games to none, winning their first baseball state championship.

Marching band
In 2009, the North Lincoln Band of Knights placed in the top 50 in the Bands of America Grand National Championships in Indianapolis, Indiana. The band has also represented the state of North Carolina on the national stage three times, at the dedication of the National WW2 Memorial in 2005 and the National Memorial Day Parade in 2013 and 2022, both in Washington D.C. It is currently under the direction of Matthew Minick, who took over from Kevin Still starting in the 2021 season.

References

External links
 Official School Website
 North Lincoln Band of Knights Official Website

Public high schools in North Carolina
Schools in Lincoln County, North Carolina